Huje is a place name that may refer to:

Germany
Huje (Germany), a municipality in the district of Steinburg, Schleswig-Holstein

Slovenia
Huje, Ilirska Bistrica, a settlement in the Municipality of Ilirska Bistrica, southwestern Slovenia
Huje, Kranj, a former village, now part of the city of Kranj, northwestern Slovenia